Korfez İskenderunspor is a sports club located in Iskenderun, Hatay Province, Turkey. The football club plays in the Hatay Amateur Leagues.

Previous names
 İskenderun Demir Çelikspor (1984–1996)
 İskenderun Demir Çelik Genel Müdürlüğü (1996–2005)
 İskenderun Demir Çelikspor (2005–2014)
 Körfez İskenderunspor (2014–present)

League participations
 TFF Second League: 1984–1987, 1995–2001, 2005–2015
 TFF Third League: 2004–2005, 2015–2016
 Turkish Regional Amateur League: 2016–2017
 Hatay Amateur Leagues: 2017–present

League performances

Source: TFF: Körfez İskenderunspor

Current squad
 2013/2014 squad.
Last update: 9 April 2014

References

External links
Körfez İskenderunspor on TFF page

Sport in İskenderun
Football clubs in Hatay
1991 establishments in Turkey